Star Trek Log is a series of ten novelizations based on, and inspired by, episodes of the science fiction television series Star Trek: The Animated Series. Published by Ballantine Books from 1974 to 1978, the series was written by Alan Dean Foster and edited by Judy-Lynn del Rey. A 1996 omnibus edition of the series was marketed as a Star Trek: The Animated Series tie-in.

The series is similar to novelizations based on episodes of Star Trek: The Original Series published by Bantam Books, written by James Blish and J. A. Lawrence.

Production 
After completing two novelizations for Ballantine Books, Luana (1974) and Dark Star (1974), Foster was approached by editor Judy-Lynn del Rey to adapt episodes of the Star Trek animated series to prose. Foster agreed, and was granted freedom to arrange the adaptations however he wished.

Foster was uncertain how to structure the series initially, but he settled on packaging three episode scripts per book, and attempted to tie them together into a cohesive story. He said of his work on the series, “I had pretty much a free hand. Hence the opportunity to insert little fun bits and pieces.” The first book, Log One, was released during the summer of 1974.

Sales of the first six books "skyrocketed", according to Foster. He was then was approached by del Ray to produce four more books, which he obliged. Log Seven (1976) through Log Ten (1978) were based on one episode script each, which allowed Foster to greatly expand their stories.

Series name 
Each book's title follows a simple pattern: Star Trek Log followed by the number in the series. Foster named the books after the captain's log narration in each episode, referring to them as Star Trek "Logs" in Voyages of Imagination (2006). Numbering each book, instead of naming them after an episode was inspired by Blish's series of novelizations, which were numbered Star Trek 1 (1967) through Star Trek 9 (1973). That series would later expand to Star Trek 12 (1977). The most recent omnibus editions used the scheme Star Trek: The Animated SeriesLog One and Two, etc.

Goodreads lists the series as Star Trek: Logs, but this varies according to which book or edition is searched. The name Star Trek Logs, plural, was adopted by contributors at Memory Alpha, and other fansites. Bibliographic sites, such as LibraryThing and the Internet Speculative Fiction Database, list the series as Star Trek Log with each book given its corresponding volume number in the series.

Reception 
A blurb credited to Cecil Smith of the Los Angeles Times was printed on the cover of Log One (1974), it read: "NBC's new animated Star Trek is… fascinating fare, written, produced and executed with all the imaginative skill, the intellectual flare and the literary level that made Gene Roddenberry's famous old science-fiction epic the most avidly followed program in TV history…" In a review included in his Complete Starfleet Library web project, Steven Roby stated Foster carried the adaptations "into territory that might as well have been a different story altogether." The amount of material included by Foster was "enough to make these books seem almost more like original novels rather than simple adaptations."

Steve Lazarowitz of SF Site said in his review of Logs Seven and Eight (1996) that Foster, "did a great job of getting inside character's heads, as well as adding enough science and pseudoscience to make the stories plausible." For fans of the original series and animated series, Lazarowitz said in his review of Logs One and Two (1996) that the books were "must have."

Blogger Tracy Poff contrasted Foster's adaptation of "shorter episodes" from the animated series against James Blish's adaptations of longer episodes from the original series, saying "after reading ten volumes of Blish’s spartan prose," Foster's prose was "refreshing."

Some volumes in the series received as many as twenty-four printings by Ballantine from 1974 to 1991.

Novelizations

Omnibus editions (1993) 
Omnibus editions published by Del Rey. Log Ten (1978) was excluded.

Animated Series (1996) 
Star Trek: The Animated Series omnibus editions were published as part of Star Trek 30th Anniversary celebration by Del Rey Books. A serialized essay by Foster was included, as well as corrections to the original text. Some printings distributed outside of North America omitted the Animated Series subtitle.

Other editions 
The series was reprinted by Corgi, and by German publishers Goldmann and Loewe. From 1978 to 1989, facsimile editions of some volumes were manufactured by vanity publishers Aeonian Press and Amereon.

Corgi reprints (1975–76) 
Corgi released reprints in limited quantities to the U.K., Australia and New Zealand. Reprints for Log Six through Ten were scheduled for 1977, but later withdrawn.

Raumschiff Enterprise (1993–1995) 
Distributed in various formats from 1993 to 1995 by publishers Goldmann and Loewe.

Pocket Books reprints (1995) 
Published by Pocket Books for the United Kingdom and AustralianNew Zealand markets.

See also 
 Star Trek (Bantam Books)
 List of Star Trek novels

Notes

References

External links 
 

Star Trek Log
Star Trek Log
Star Trek Log
Science fiction book series